Kuka is the name of two rural localities in Chitinsky District of Zabaykalsky Krai, Russia:
Kuka (selo), a selo
Kuka (settlement at the station), a rural locality classified as a settlement at the station

References